The Weinheimer Senioren-Convent (abbreviation: WSC) is the second oldest association of German Studentenverbindungen. It comprises roughly 60 German Corps, all of which are based upon the principle of tolerance.

The WSC had been founded in Frankfurt in 1863 under the name of „Allgemeiner Senioren-Convent" (ASC). Soon it moved its venue to Weinheim near Heidelberg in 1864 and it adopted the name of Weinheimer Senioren Convent in 1867. The WSC has built a castle near Weinheim to suit their needs - the Wachenburg. It has merged the Corps of the Rudolstädter Senioren-Convent (RSC) and the Naumburger Senioren-Convent (NSC) in 1934. Since 1955 the WSC has an association treaty with the Kösener Senioren-Convents-Verband (abbreviated KSCV, the oldest and largest association of Corps).

In 1997, members of the Weinheimer Senioren Convents (WSC "Corps") came to the United States to discuss the possibility of forming an international fraternity cooperation with Tau Kappa Epsilon International Fraternity, the largest collegiate social fraternity in North America. Through this meeting a fraternal exchange program was created between TKE and the German Corps whereby Corps members and Tekes could visit one another, learn one another's traditions, and see how fraternities separated by an ocean and centuries in age share similarities in structure, direction, values, programs, and results.

List of Corps 
In alphabetic order with Corps present on the English Wikipedia (links in blue) first. Pages in the German Wikipedia can further be reached by clicking on the (de).

|-
! class="hintergrundfarbe5" align="center" |Corps
! class="hintergrundfarbe5" align="center" |Location
! class="hintergrundfarbe5" align="center" |Senioren-Convent
! class="hintergrundfarbe5" align="center" |Foundation
! class="hintergrundfarbe5" align="center" |WSC entry
! class="hintergrundfarbe5" align="center" |Colors
!Fuchsen-colors
! class="hintergrundfarbe5 unsortable" align="center" |Crest
! class="hintergrundfarbe5 unsortable" align="center" |"Zirkel"
! class="hintergrundfarbe5" align="center" |Cartel
! class="hintergrundfarbe5" align="center" |House
|-
| Marko-Guestphalia Aachen (de)||Aachen||SC zu Aachen||1871||1871||align="center"|
(linden)green-white-black
|
green-white
|| || ||||.Haus.
|-
| Delta Aachen||Aachen||SC zu Aachen||1871||1903||align="center"|
white-red-gold
|
gold-red-gold
||||||||.Haus.
|-
| Montania Aachen||Aachen||SC zu Aachen||1872||1920||align="center"|
green-white-red
|
green-white-green
||||||||.Haus.
|-
| Saxo-Montania zu Freiberg und Dresden in Aachen (de)||Aachen||SC zu Aachen||1798||1873||align="center"|
blue-white-gold
|
blue-white
||  || ||||.Haus.
|-
| Palaeo-Teutonia (Teutonia Freiberg) Aachen (de)||Aachen||SC zu Aachen||1867||||align="center"|
black-white-blue
|
black-white
||  || ||Viererbund (league of four)||
|-
| Saxonia-Berlin zu Aachen||Aachen||SC zu Aachen||1867||1891||align="center"|
black-green-gold
|
gold-green-gold
||||||Fünferbund (league of five)||.Haus.
|-
| Franconia Fribergensis (de)||Aachen||SC zu Aachen||1838||1882||align="center"|
green-gold-red
|
green-gold-green
||||||||.Haus.
|-
| Rhenania ZAB (de)||Braunschweig||SC zu Braunschweig||1855||1863||align="center"|
blue-gold-red
|
||||||Fünferbund (league of five)||.Haus.
|-
| Teutonia-Hercynia Braunschweig (de)||Braunschweig||SC zu Braunschweig||1866||1876||align="center"|
green-white-red
|
||||||||
|-
| Marchia Braunschweig||Braunschweig||SC zu Braunschweig||1893||1927||align="center"|
grey-white-red
|
||||||||.Haus.
|-
| Frisia Braunschweig||Braunschweig||SC zu Braunschweig||1881||1920||align="center"|
black-gold-light blue
|
||||||||.Haus.
|-
| Corps Berlin (de)||Berlin||SC zu Braunschweig||1859/2009||1891||align="center"|
blue-red-green
|
||||||Blaues Kartell (blue cartel)||.Haus.
|-
| Hercynia Clausthal (de)||Clausthal||SC zu Clausthal||1866||1874/1905||align="center"|
light blue-white-dark blue
|
light blue-white
||||||||
|-
| Montania Clausthal (de)||Clausthal||SC zu Clausthal||1868||1874/1905||align="center"|
blue-white-red
|
blue-white-red
||||||Viererbund (league of four)||
|-
| Borussia Clausthal||Clausthal||SC zu Clausthal||1875||1892||align="center"|
black-white-black
|
black-white
||||||||
|-
| Hassia Darmstadt (de)||Darmstadt||SC zu Darmstadt||1840||1874||align="center"|
green-white-red
|
green-white-green
||||||||
|-
| Rhenania Darmstadt||Darmstadt||SC zu Darmstadt||1872||1874||align="center"|
violett-white-gold
|
violett-white
||||||||.Haus.
|-
| Franconia Darmstadt (de)||Darmstadt||SC zu Darmstadt||1889||1895||align="center"|
black-white-lindgreen
|
black-white
||  
||  ||||
|-
| Obotritia Darmstadt||Darmstadt||SC zu Darmstadt||1861 in Hanover||1899|| align="center" |
blue-yellow-red
|
blue-yellow-blue
||||||||.Haus.
|-
| Chattia Darmstadt||Darmstadt||SC zu Darmstadt||1894||..||align="center"|
black-green-red
|
black-green
||||||||.Haus.
|-
| Hermunduria Leipzig zu Mannheim-Heidelberg||Mannheim||SC zu Darmstadt||1898||1934||align="center"|
violett-white-gold
|
violett-white-violett
|||||||.Haus.
|-
| Rheno-Nicaria zu Mannheim und Heidelberg (Rheno-Nicaria zu Mannheim und Heidelberg|de)||Mannheim||SC zu Darmstadt||1909
||1953||align="center"|
black-white-green
|
black-white-black
||  ||||||
|-
| Franconia Berlin zu Kaiserslautern||Kaiserslautern||SC zu Darmstadt||1850||..||align="center"|
green-red-gold
|
green-red-green
||||||Grünes Kartell (green cartel)||.Haus.
|-
| Thuringia Heidelberg||Heidelberg||SC zu Darmstadt||1908||1995||align="center"|
black-karmesinred-white
|
karmesinred-white
||||||||.Haus.
|-
| Saxonia Hannover (de)||Hannover||SC zu Hannover ||1852
|1863||align="center"|
green-white-black
|
||||||Saxenkartell (saxon cartel)||
|-
| Slesvico-Holsatia Hannover (de)||Hannover||SC zu Hannover ||1852
|1869||align="center"|
blue-white-red
|
||||||Fünferbund (league of five)||.Haus.
|-
| Alemannia-Thuringia zu Magdeburg (de)||Magdeburg||SC zu Hannover ||1865||1874||align="center"|
green-red-gold
|
||||||||.Haus.
|-
| Hannovera Hannover (de)||Hannover||SC zu Hannover ||1866
|||align="center"|
red-white-black
|
||||||||
|-
| Hannoverania Hannover||Hannover||SC zu Hannover ||1856 
|
|align="center"|
blue-red-gold
|
|||||Blaues Kartell (blue cartel)
||.Haus.
|-
| Normannia Hannover (de)||Hannover||SC zu Hannover ||1859||1952||align="center"|
prussian blue-white-frühlingslaubgreen
|
||||||Grünes Kartell (green cartel)||
|-
| Irminsul Hamburg (de)||Hamburg||SC zu Hannover ||1880||1934||align="center"|
light blue-silber-black
|
||||||Weißes Kartell (white cartel)||
|-
| Rhenania Hamburg||Hamburg||SC zu Hannover ||1920||..||align="center"|
white-black-red
|
|||||||
|-
| Agronomia Hallensis zu Göttingen (de)||Göttingen||SC zu Hannover ||1863||1934||align="center"|
white-black-white
|
|| ||||||
|-
| Alemannia Kiel||Kiel||SC zu Hannover ||1876||..||align="center"|
blue-white-green
|
||||||||.Haus.
|-
| Baltica-Borussia Danzig zu Bielefeld (de)||Bielefeld||SC zu Hannover ||1860||1905||align="center"|
light blue-black-white
|
||  ||||||.Haus.
|-
| Frisia Göttingen – Corps der Friesen und Lüneburger (de)||Göttingen||SC zu Hannover ||1811||2004||align="center"|
blue-red-black
|
||||||||
|-
| Franconia Karlsruhe (de)||Karlsruhe||SC zu Karlsruhe||1839||1863||align="center"|
green-white-red
|
||  ||  ||Fünferbund (league of five)||.Haus.
|-
| Saxonia Karlsruhe (de)||Karlsruhe||SC zu Karlsruhe||1856||1863||align="center"|
green-white-black
|
||  || ||Saxenkartell (saxon cartel)||
|-
| Alemannia Karlsruhe (de)||Karlsruhe||SC zu Karlsruhe||1860||1863||align="center"|
white-light blue-pink
|
|| ||||||
|-
| Friso-Cheruskia Karlsruhe (de)||Karlsruhe||SC zu Karlsruhe||1860||1863||align="center"|
light blue-white-dark blue
|
|| ||||||.Haus.
|-
| Silingia Breslau zu Köln (de)||Köln||SC zu Köln (vormals SC zu Köln-Bonn)||1877||1926||align="center"|
blue-gold-white
|
||  ||||||
|-
| Franco-Guestphalia zu Köln||Köln||SC zu Köln (vormals SC zu Köln-Bonn)||1879||1934 ||align="center"|
red-white-gold
|
||||||Weißes Kartell (white cartel)||.Haus.
|-
| Cisaria (de)||München||Münchner SC, Weinheimer Corps||1851||1912||align="center"|
(krapp)red-white-green
|
||  ||||||
|-
| Vitruvia||München||Münchner SC, Weinheimer Corps||1863
|1912||align="center"|
blue-white-pink
|
|||||||.Haus.
|-
| Germania München (de)||München||Münchner SC, Weinheimer Corps||1863||1912||align="center"|
blue-gold-red
|
||  ||||||
|-
| Suevo-Guestphalia (de)||München||Münchner SC, Weinheimer Corps||1877||1906||align="center"|
black-white-green
|
||||||Grünes Kartell (green cartel)||
|-
| Normannia-Vandalia||München||Münchner SC, Weinheimer Corps||1869||1911||align="center"|

green-red-gold
light blue-white-green
|
green-red
||||||||.Haus.
|-
| Saxo-Thuringia (de)||München||Münchner SC, Weinheimer Corps||1882||1934||align="center"|
light blue-white-orange
|
||||||Blaues Kartell (blue cartel)||.Haus.
|-
| Alemannia München (de)||München||Münchner SC, Weinheimer Corps||1855||1934||align="center"|
black-gold-green
|
||||||||.Haus.
|-
|  Pomerania-Silesia Bayreuth||Bayreuth||Münchner SC, Weinheimer Corps||1865||..||align="center"|
light blue-white-gold
|
|||||||.Haus.
|-
| Saxo-Borussia Freiberg (de)||Freiberg||Sächsischer SC||1842||..||align="center"|
black-green-white
|
||||||||.Haus.
|-
| Altsachsen Dresden (de)||Dresden||Sächsischer SC||1861||1927||align="center"|
 grey-green-gold
|
||
||||Blaues Kartell (blue cartel)||
|-
| Teutonia Dresden||Dresden||Sächsischer SC||1859||1875||align="center"|
white-red-black
|
||||||Viererbund (league of four)||
|-
| Teutonia Stuttgart (de)||Stuttgart||SC zu Stuttgart||1852||1863||align="center"|
green-gold-red
|
||||||Viererbund (league of four)||
|-
| Rhenania Stuttgart||Stuttgart||SC zu Stuttgart||1859||1863||align="center"|
pink-white-blue
|
||||||||.Haus.
|-
| Stauffia Stuttgart (de)||Stuttgart||SC zu Stuttgart||1847||1863||align="center"|
black-gold-black
|
||||||Fünferbund (league of five)||
|-
| Bavaria Stuttgart||Stuttgart||SC zu Stuttgart||1886||..||align="center"|
light blue-white-dark blue
|
||||||||.Haus.
|-
| Germania Hohenheim (de)||Hohenheim||SC zu Stuttgart||1903||1922||align="center"|
black-white-red
|
||||||||.Haus.
|-
| Marchia Greifswald (de)||Greifswald||without SC||1881||1934||align="center"|
pink-white-pink
|
||||||Weißes Kartell (white cartel)
|
|-
|}

References

External links
Tau Kappa Epsilon German Corps Affiliation 

 reportage on Corps in English language; .jpg-scans only!

Links to web sites in German language:
 Homepage of the two Corps associations
 Corps in Austria

 
Student societies in Germany
Student organizations established in 1863
1863 establishments in Germany